Serge Krizman (July 8, 1914October 24, 2008) was an American actor, art director and production designer. He was nominated for two Primetime Emmy Awards in the category Outstanding Art Direction for his work on the television program Schlitz Playhouse of Stars. Krizman died in October 2008 in Santa Fe, New Mexico, at the age of 94.

References

External links 

1914 births
2008 deaths
Male actors from Zagreb
Yugoslav emigrants to the United States
American male film actors
American art directors
American production designers
20th-century American male actors